Cold Chisel is the self-titled debut album of Australian pub rock band Cold Chisel. Released in April 1978, it spent 23 weeks in the Australian charts, peaking at number 38.

Album details
The figure in the foreground of the cover is Micki Braithwaite, Daryl Braithwaite's wife.

"Cold Chisel" was produced by the inexperienced Peter Walker, who had previously played guitar with Bakery and been an inspiration to young Ian Moss. The release of the album was hurried to coincide with a tour the band had opening for Foreigner. Although the album was well-received, Don Walker was later to say he found it embarrassing, especially the "flowery" lyrics.

Producer Peter Walker intended the album to be a showcase of the breadth of Don Walker's song-writing, and the songs range between jazz-and-blues-based ballads to hard rock. Walker, who wrote the lyrics for all the songs, described the album as being about a former lover that he had separated from long before recording commenced. He said, "I'm involved there, sometimes to the detriment of the song. 'Cause those songs were not great." Barnes felt that early fans of the band's live performances may have been disappointed, with Don Walker agreeing, "It's a bit more laid back than it should have been. That would have been OK if the 'up' songs has been a bit more energetic, like they are onstage."

Barnes, while defending Peter Walker, found the recording experience unsatisfying. He said, "He liked to explain the ins and outs of recording to us. I could only hear so much about compression ratios before I wanted to blow a gasket and get really drunk."

The band initially saw themselves as an "album band" like Led Zeppelin that was less reliant on singles, and had not intended to release a single from the album.  Barnes said, "Every DJ in the country begged us to release "Khe Sanh" as a single. Then they banned it two weeks later. They had to ban something once a week to keep the Catholic Church happy."

Reception
AllMusic praised the, "lyrical imagery, the mix of musical finesse and freneticism, and Barnes' razor-wire vocals," and described the album as a, "stunning debut album. At once polished and raw, this is a classic."

The album received a warm review in the Sydney Morning Herald, saying, "The blues down under have been captured occasionally on record in the past. Richard Clapton was successful at it. Now we have Cold Chisel, wailing with compassion and conviction." The reviewer, Gil Wahlquist, noted the band had, "got together an impressive string of musical portraits of life in the city."

The Canberra Times said, "Cold Chisel have delivered a very impressive debut which leave me at odds in trying to lay any constructive criticism - the band just exudes potential." Roadrunner said the music had a, "solid blues base." The lyrics were, "not your standard introspective stuff. It's a truly Australian album, it explores Australian themes,  talks about things that happen here and even uses the names of our towns. Only The Dingoes and Richard Clapton (and perhaps Skyhooks) have done this before.

Warwick McFadyen said the album was, "lightning in a bottle.  It flashed and sparked, an explosion of electrical storms that at times turned into a smooth slow river of mercury. It was jazz anarchy in its attitude; fast, loud, angry, sad, melancholic, resigned, defiant. Let the heavens rain upon me, they never bettered it."

Track listing
All songs by Don Walker, except as noted

Side one
 "Juliet" (Walker, Jim Barnes) - 2:43
 "Khe Sanh" - 4:14
 "Home and Broken Hearted" - 3:25
 "One Long Day" - 7:23

Side two
 "Northbound" - 3:14
 "Rosaline" - 4:47
 "Daskarzine" - 5:09
 "Just How Many Times" - 5:13

In 1999, Atlantic released a remastered version of the album with four bonus tracks:
 "Teenage Love Affair" - 6:03 (from the 1994 compilation album Teenage Love)
 "Drinkin' in Port Lincoln" - 3:24 (also from the 1994 compilation album Teenage Love)
 "H-Hour Hotel" - 3:26
 "On the Road" - 3:13

"H-Hour Hotel" and "On the Road" are included on the 2011 compilation album, Besides.

Personnel
Jim Barnes - vocals
Ian Moss - lead vocals tracks 4 & 6, guitar
Don Walker - organ, piano, backing vocals
Steve Prestwich - drums
Phil Small - bass
Dave Blight - harmonica, track 2 & 5
Peter Walker - acoustic guitar, track 2
Wilbur Wilde - saxophone, tracks 3, 6 and 8
Joe Camilleri - saxophone
Janice Slater - backing vocals
Carol Stubbley - backing vocals

Charts

Certifications and sales

References

1978 debut albums
Cold Chisel albums
Elektra Records albums